Kankesanthurai Lighthouse is a lighthouse in Kankesanthurai in northern Sri Lanka. Built in 1893, the  lighthouse has an octagonal masonry tower with lantern and gallery. Located deep inside the Sri Lankan military's Valikamam North High Security Zone and next to a naval base, the lighthouse was heavily damaged during the Sri Lankan Civil War and is inactive.

See also

 List of lighthouses in Sri Lanka

References

External links
 Sri Lanka Ports Authority 
 Lighthouses of Sri Lanka
 Picture of Kankesanthurai Lighthouse in 2015 

Lighthouses completed in 1893
Lighthouses in Sri Lanka
Buildings and structures in Jaffna District